Furio is a given name of Italian origin (and derived from Latin Furius meaning "furious").

Notable persons and fictional figures with that name include:

People
 Furio Bordon (born c. 1970), Italian playwright
 Marcus Furius Camillus, also known as Marco Furio Camillo (c. 446–365 BCE), Roman general
 Furio Niclot Doglio (1908–1942), Italian test pilot and World War II ace
 Furio Fusi (born 1947), Italian sprinter
 Furio Nordio (fl. 1960s), Italian bobsledder
 Furio Piccirilli (1869–1949) American sculptor
 Furio Radin (fl. since 1990s), Croatian legislator
 Jacopo Furio Sarno (born 1989), Italian actor
 Furio Scarpelli (1919–2010), Italian screenwriter

Fictional or fictionalized characters 
 Furio, in the Italian film The White Sheik (1952)
 Titular characters of operas, Furio Camillo, about  Marcus Furius Camillus:
 Furio Camillo (Pacini) (1839), by Giovanni Pacini
   Furio Camillo (Perti) (1692), by Giacomo Antonio Perti
 Furio Derek, villain in Power Rangers Lost Galaxy (1999)
 Furio Giunta, Italian gangster in The Sopranos (2000–02)
 Furio Tigre, witness to a murder in Ace Attorney (2009)

See also
Furio (surname)

Italian masculine given names